Raphitoma alida is an extinct species of sea snail, a marine gastropod mollusc in the family Raphitomidae.

Description
The length of the shell reaches a length of 17.1 mm and a diameter of 7 mm.

Distribution
Fossils of this extinct marine species were found on Sicily, Italy

References

External links
 Pusateri F., Giannuzzi-Savelli R. & Bartolini S. (2016). A revision of the Mediterranean Raphitomidae, 3: on the Raphitoma pupoides (Monterosato, 1884) complex, with the description of a new species (Mollusca Gastropoda). Biodiversity Journal. 7(1): 103-115
 Barrientos, Z. (2019). A new genus of semislugs (Stylommatophora, Euconulidae) from Costa Rica and a review of the genus Velifera (Stylommatophora, Euconulidae). Revista de Biología Tropical. 67(6): 1313-1358

alida
Gastropods described in 2016